Moussi is a surname. Notable people with the surname include:

Abdeslam Moussi (born 1990), Algerian footballer 
Abir Moussi (born 1975), Tunisian lawyer and politician
Alain Moussi (born 1981), Gabonese-Canadian actor, stuntman, and martial artist
Guy Moussi (born 1985), French footballer